Rachel Jane Petrie (born 21 April 1971 in Ashburton, New Zealand) is a former field hockey defender from New Zealand, who finished sixth with her national team at the 2000 Summer Olympics in Sydney.

She attended Burnside High School, Christchurch from 1984 to 1988.

References

External links

New Zealand female field hockey players
Olympic field hockey players of New Zealand
Field hockey players at the 2000 Summer Olympics
1971 births
Living people
Sportspeople from Ashburton, New Zealand
People educated at Burnside High School